Get That Man is a 1935 American drama film directed by Spencer Gordon Bennet, from a screenplay by Betty Burbridge. It stars Wallace Ford as Jack Kirkland, a taxi driver who discovers he closely resembles of a murdered heir to a fortune. Ford also plays the murdered heir, John Prescott.

Due to a failure to renew copyright, it is now in the public domain.

Cast
Wallace Ford as Jack Kirkland/John Prescott
Finis Barton as Diane Prescott
E. Alyn Warren as Jay Malone
Leon Ames as Don Malone
Lillian Miles as Fay Prescott
Laura Treadwell as Mrs. Prescott
William Humphries as Mr. Brownlee
Johnstone White as Mr. Joyce

Release
Originally released on July 11, 1935, Get That Man appears regularly on many public domain DVD compilations. It was released as a standalone disc on July 26, 2011 by Alpha Video.

Reception
Hal Erickson graded Get That Man with two out of five stars.

References

External links

 

1935 films
1935 drama films
American drama films
1930s English-language films
American black-and-white films
Mayfair Pictures films
Films directed by Spencer Gordon Bennet
1930s American films